KPJP (89.3 FM) is a radio station licensed to broadcast from Greenville, California, serving the surrounding Sierra Nevada area.  It is in Plumas County, Northern California. The station is owned by Relevant Radio, Inc.

External links

Plumas County, California
Relevant Radio stations
Radio stations established in 2004
2004 establishments in California
PJP